State of Georgia is an American television sitcom. It stars Raven-Symoné, Majandra Delfino, and Loretta Devine. The half-hour multi-cam comedy series stars Raven-Symoné as Georgia, an aspiring actress with a larger-than-life personality, and her science geek best friend, Jo (Majandra Delfino), who are trying to make professional and personal headway in New York City. The series ran on ABC Family from June 29 to August 17, 2011. The pilot episode had 1.32 million viewers.

On September 16, 2011, ABC Family canceled State of Georgia after one season, due to poor ratings.

Premise
Georgia Chamberlain (Raven-Symoné) is an aspiring actress from the south who wants to become a household name, so she moves to New York City with her science geek best friend, Jo (Delfino). Georgia's Aunt Honey (Loretta Devine) is a wealthy woman with an active sex life who appears to give the girls advice.

Cast and characters
 Raven-Symoné portrays Georgia Chamberlain, a bold and confident young woman from the South, who moved to New York to pursue her dream of becoming an actress.
 Majandra Delfino portrays Josephina "Jo" Pye, Georgia's shy and timid best friend. She moved to New York with her best friend Georgia and is a graduate student in physics.
 Loretta Devine portrays Honey Dupree, Georgia's nymphomaniac aunt who owns the apartment where the girls live. With an active life, she appears from time to time on their floor to give the girls advice and listen to their problems, and share her own adventures.
 Kevin Covais portrays Lewis, a member of Jo's grad student physics group. He doesn't accept that Jo is the leader of the group because she is a woman. He is the typical nerd who thinks he's cool and is always trying to be the leader. He has a not-so-secret crush on Jo, claiming, "I`ve always loved you!", in one episode.
 Hasan Minhaj portrays Seth, a member of Jo's grad student physics group. He is always the target of Leo's jokes and also thinks Jo is very attractive.
 Jason Rogel portrays Leo, a member of Jo's grad student physics group. He is fond of making jokes regarding Seth's intimacy.

Development and production
The project is from ABC Studios. The pilot was written by the author Jennifer Weiner (In Her Shoes) and Jeff Greenstein (Desperate Housewives), it was announced on October 8, 2010. After starring in the ABC Family original film Revenge of the Bridesmaids, Raven-Symoné went in to pitch the cable network a half-hour project with the writer Yvette Lee Bowser to star and produce a new series. The two sides were in negotiations when ABC Family managers brought up Georgia and in November 17, 2010, it was announced that she would star in Georgia. The series was originally called The Great State of Georgia. The pilot was filmed in 2010. On January 31, 2011, it was announced that ABC Family had approved the series and twelve episodes (with the pilot) had been ordered.

Episodes

Home releases

State of Georgia: The Complete Season 1 has no release date. All episodes of State of Georgia are also available through the iTunes Store where each episode can be purchased separately or as the complete first season. The episodes "Pilot" and "Flavor of the Week" were available as a free download available on iTunes on July 7, 2011.

Awards and nominations

International broadcast

References

External links 
 

2010s American black sitcoms
2010s American teen sitcoms
2011 American television series debuts
2011 American television series endings
ABC Family original programming
Television series by ABC Studios
English-language television shows
Television shows set in New York City
Television series by Disney–ABC Domestic Television